Raymond Schummer (31 March 1937 – 10 October 2009) was a Luxembourgian wrestler. He competed at the 1960 Summer Olympics and the 1964 Summer Olympics.

References

1937 births
2009 deaths
Luxembourgian male sport wrestlers
Olympic wrestlers of Luxembourg
Wrestlers at the 1960 Summer Olympics
Wrestlers at the 1964 Summer Olympics
Sportspeople from Luxembourg City